Ptolemy son of Abubus was an official in the early Hasmonean kingdom which then controlled Judea.  According to the book of 1 Maccabees, in 135 BC, he served as the governor of Jericho. 
While High Priest Simon Thassi was visiting, Ptolemy orchestrated the murder of Simon and two of his sons, as well as some of Simon's servants.  This act of betrayal of guest right earned Ptolemy a place in Dante's The Divine Comedy; one of the layers of hell described in Inferno is called Ptolemaea, where those who betray guests in their home suffer.

Primary sources
The only sources that survived from antiquity describing Ptolemy are the book of 1 Maccabees and Josephus's Jewish Antiquities Book 13, Chapter 7–8.  According to them, Ptolemy was the cause of the death of High Priest Simon Thassi despite having married one of Simon's daughters:

The year 177 of the Seleucid era during the month of Shevat would correspond to about February 135 BC.  Based on these accounts, Ptolemy was hoping to launch a coup and take power for himself.  After killing the High Priest and two potential successors, Ptolemy appealed to king of the Seleucid Empire Antiochus VII Sidetes (reigned 138 to 129 BC) to take his side.  The succession crisis would allow him to be recognized as the new governor (ethnarch) of Judea by the Seleucids, who still maintained a suzerain-type relationship with the nascent Judean state.  His marriage with a Hasmonean would have given him at least a partial claim to power.  If this was his plan, then his assassins failing to kill Simon's remaining son John Hyrcanus and being executed themselves foiled it.  According to Josephus, Ptolemy attempted to enter Jerusalem to take command but was thrown out by the hostile populace who had already acclaimed John as the new High Priest.  He retreated to a fortress of his called Dagon by Josephus, which may have been the same as the Dok referred to in 1 Maccabees.  There he was besieged by John and his armies.  Somehow, Ptolemy took John Hyrcanus's mother (presumably also Simon's wife) captive, perhaps because she was with the entourage during the ambush.  John's siege was unsuccessful, but Ptolemy decided to flee regardless, spitefully executed Hyrcanus's mother, and was forced into exile.  He fled to Rabbath-Ammon, also known as Philadelphia.  After that, his fate is unrecorded.

In culture
Ptolemy is perhaps most famous for his appearance in Dante Alighieri's The Divine Comedy.  In Inferno, Ptolemy is punished for the sin of treachery, which Dante saw as the gravest of all crimes, and resides in the ninth and deepest circle of Hell with Satan, Judas Iscariot, and Cain. His memory is perpetuated in Dante's Inferno as 'Ptolemaea', a place in hell designated for traitors against guests in their home.

References

External links
 , Chapter 7

Seleucid people in the books of the Maccabees